Nee is a Kannada music band, founded by Siddeshwar, released their debut album on Nee Music on June, 2009

The first ever Kannada Album by IT Professionals.

Filmography 

The duo from the band, Siddeshwar and Vikram has composed music for a Sandalwood film Jai Hind, produced by Major Srinivas Pujar.

Early days 
The thought process emanated early in the year 2001 with an objective of making music albums. Siddeshwar, the founder of Nee, went on a talent search to build a strong music team to make innovative songs. Sairam became a strong pillar of Nee since 2004 and composed several Hindi songs which include a Nee Album Hit score 'Pahadi'.

Nee became a complete music troop in the year 2007 with Sumitra and Joshi joining in.
The Nee group performed live on 15 December 2008 on the sets of TV9 (National News Channel) that became a big booster for them to create a music album.

Motive 
Nee's motive is to give a message to the society; one of the album’s songs showcases the four noble truths of life as enlightened by Gautama Buddha.

This album showcases all shades of life like happiness, sorrow, romance, excitement, enjoyment, love for nature so on and so forth. Nee is the first Kannada music album of its kind, which gratifies likes of all ages.

Discography

2009: Nee – Rebirth of Music 
The band Nee's self-titled debut album was launched by the popular music director Raghu Dixit on the band's new independent record label 'Nee Music'.

References

External links 
 Official Band Website
 My Space
 Band Nee's Free Audio Streaming at KannadaAudio.com
 Band Nee's Free Audio Streaming at Raaga.com

Indian musical groups
Musical groups established in 2009